Söğütözü is a neighbourhood in Çankaya, the main central business district of Ankara, Turkey.

It is located between the Eskişehir Road (D-200 Eskişehir Yolu) and Atatürk Forest Farm and Zoo. Its postal code is 06510.

Many of the city's newest skyscrapers and shopping malls such as the Armada Tower & Mall are in Söğütözü, which is served by a subway station on the M2 line of the Ankara Metro, and a light rail station on the A1 line of Ankaray.

See also
List of shopping malls in Ankara
List of tallest buildings in Ankara

References

External links
Armada Mall & Business Center in Söğütözü, Ankara
A view of Söğütözü, Ankara, at night

Yenimahalle, Ankara
Districts of Ankara Province
Populated places in Ankara Province
Central business districts